A list of things named for French physicist Charles-Augustin de Coulomb (1736–1806). For additional uses of the term, see coulomb (disambiguation)

 coulomb (symbol C), the SI unit of electric charge
 Coulomb's law
 Coulomb constant
 Coulomb barrier
 Coulomb blockade
 Coulomb collision
 Coulomb damping
 Coulomb excitation
 Coulomb explosion
 Coulomb friction
 Coulomb gap
 Coulomb gauge
 Coulomb Hamiltonian
 Coulomb logarithm
 Coulomb operator
 Coulomb phase
 Coulomb potential
 Coulomb scattering (Rutherford scattering)
 Coulomb scattering state
 Coulomb stress transfer
 Coulomb wave function
 A coulomb wave function is a solution to the coulomb wave equation
 Coulomb, a lunar crater
 Coulomb-Sarton Basin, lunar basin named after the craters Coulomb and Sarton
 Coulometry
 Interatomic Coulombic decay
 Mohr–Coulomb theory
 Screened Coulomb Potentials Implicit Solvent Model
 Statcoulomb (Symbol statC)

See also
 Coulomb (disambiguation)
 Coulombs (disambiguation)
 

Coulomb